Niklas Tikkinen (born June 1, 1994) is a Finnish professional ice hockey defenseman, currently playing with the Glasgow Clan in the UK's Elite Ice Hockey League (EIHL). Tikkinen was previously with the Herlev Eagles in the Danish Metal Ligaen. Tikkinen was selected by the Phoenix Coyotes in the 5th round (148th overall) of the 2012 NHL Entry Draft.

Tikkinen made his SM-liiga debut playing with Espoo Blues during the 2012–13 SM-liiga season. He has subsequently played in the HockeyAllsvenskan, the Alps Hockey League, the ICE Hockey League, and the Metal Ligaen.

References

External links
 

1994 births
Living people
Arizona Coyotes draft picks
Asplöven HC players
Finnish ice hockey defencemen
Espoo Blues players
Espoo United players
Glasgow Clan players
HC Keski-Uusimaa players
Herlev Eagles players
JYP-Akatemia players
JYP Jyväskylä players
Mikkelin Jukurit players
Peliitat Heinola players
Sportspeople from Espoo
Timrå IK players
VEU Feldkirch players
Finnish expatriate ice hockey players in Denmark
Finnish expatriate ice hockey players in Sweden
Finnish expatriate ice hockey players in Austria
Finnish expatriate ice hockey players in Scotland